George Thorne was a British golfer who competed in the 1900 Summer Olympics. At the 1900 Olympics, Thorne finished sixth in the men's individual event.

References

External links
 

Year of birth missing
Year of death missing
British male golfers
Amateur golfers
Olympic golfers of Great Britain
Golfers at the 1900 Summer Olympics
Place of birth missing
Place of death missing